Maa Kaali and Bhagwan Shankar Temple is an ancient Hindu temple. It is situated in Bisauri village Jaunpur district, Uttar Pradesh, India. Maha Shivratri and Navratri are some main festivals celebrated.

References

Hindu temples in Uttar Pradesh
Jaunpur district